General elections were held in Aruba on 27 September 2013. The result was a victory for the ruling Aruban People's Party, which won 13 of the 21 seats in the Estates.

Electoral system
The 21 members of the Estates were elected by open list proportional representation in a single nationwide constituency.

Results

References

General election
Aruba
Elections in Aruba